The Federal Medical Center, Carswell (FMC Carswell) is a United States federal prison in Fort Worth, Texas, for female inmates of all security levels, primarily with special medical and mental health needs. It is operated by the Federal Bureau of Prisons (BOP), a division of the United States Department of Justice. The facility also has a prison camp for minimum-security female inmates.

As of April 2020, 1,625 women were confined at FMC Carswell. The facility is located in the northeast corner of Naval Air Station Joint Reserve Base Fort Worth, formerly known as Carswell Air Force Base. It lies in the northwest part of the city of Fort Worth, near the southeast corner of Lake Worth.

The director of the DC Prisoners' Project stated in 2009 that Carswell, along with FMC Butner and FMC Rochester, "are clearly the "gold standard" in terms of what BOP facilities can achieve in providing medical care," and that they had provided "excellent medical care, sometimes for extremely complex medical needs."  The prison has seen media coverage due to incidents of abuses of inmates by prison staff, as well as the presence of several high-profile prisoners. Significantly affected by the COVID-19 pandemic, Carswell has had one of the highest rates of infection among all federal prisons in the United States, with hundreds of prisoners contracting the virus and at least four dying.

History
Prior to the facility's opening, women went to a federal prison hospital in Kentucky that also served male prisoners. FMC Carswell opened in 1994. The facility previously served as the medical center for Carswell Air Force Base.

Facility and programs
FMC Carswell is fully accredited by the Joint Commission on Accreditation of Healthcare Organizations and the American Correctional Association. It is the only medical facility for women in the Federal Bureau of Prisons.

The main five-story building has a capacity of 600 prisoners. The minimum security prisoners live in barracks, outside of the main compound.

Although most inmates at this facility have some form of medical condition requiring treatment, there is also a general population of inmates at FMC Carswell who do not. Carswell housed the last woman who was under a federal death sentence, Lisa Marie Montgomery, who had murdered a young pregnant woman and then cut the woman's unborn fetus from her womb. Montgomery was scheduled to be executed via lethal injection on December 8, 2020; however, this was rescheduled for January 12, 2021, as her attorneys contracted COVID-19.  She was executed on January 13, 2021.

FMC Carswell has an administrative high security unit, which houses women in the BOP system who are classified as "special management concerns" due to violence and/or escape attempts. The unit has a capacity of 20 women; according to a report published on July 6, 2018, there were 10 women confined in the unit.

Notable incidents
Articles criticizing FMC Carswell have appeared in various media outlets relating to various forms of prisoner abuse. These articles focus on allegations of medical malpractice, neglect, and sexual abuse of inmates by staff. Over a seven-year period, seven FMC Carswell staff members were convicted of sexual abuse of a prisoner. In March 2000, a correction officer at FMC Carswell, Michael Lawrence Miller, raped a prisoner. The prisoner did not report the incident after it occurred, but kept a pair of sweatpants she wore during the incident as proof. As she was being released in September 2000, she gave the sweatpants to a prison administrator. Implicated by this evidence, Miller was convicted, and in 2004 he was sentenced to 150 months (12 years and 6 months) imprisonment. He served out his sentence at the Federal Correctional Institution, Sandstone, and was released on March 19, 2015.

In May 2008, Vincent Inametti, a Roman Catholic priest who worked as a chaplain at FMC Carswell, was sentenced to 48 months in prison and ordered to pay a $3,000 fine after pleading guilty in November 2007 to two counts of sexual abuse of two inmates. Inametti, Register # 36889-177, was imprisoned at the Federal Correctional Institution, Butner Low in North Carolina and released in October 2011.

Coronavirus pandemic
In April 2020, the BOP announced the first death of an inmate at FMC Carswell due to COVID-19. On April 1, doctors had performed an emergency Caesarean section to deliver the premature daughter of the inmate, who three days later tested positive, making her the only inmate to contract coronavirus at FMC Carswell. The 30-year-old Native American Andrea Circle Bear (BOP# 18015-273), who was serving a two-year sentence on a drug-related charge, died on April 28.

In July 2020, it was reported that 28-year-old inmate Reality Winner had tested positive for COVID-19, bringing the prison's total of confirmed cases to more than 500. According to The Guardian, "Despite weeks of pleas for cleaning supplies and commissary privileges, attorneys, health providers and even the guard's union are all denouncing the rudimentary protocols inside FMC Carswell." In an email to her sister, Winner said guards were mocking infected prisoners.

Notable inmates (current and former)

Death row

Former death row

Non-death row

High-profile inmates

Other notable inmates

See also

List of U.S. federal prisons
Federal Bureau of Prisons
Incarceration in the United States

References

External links

  FMC Carswell page at BOP.gov
 "Abuse at Carswell Prison is for real", May 21, 2000, Molly Ivins
 Brink, Betty. "Taking the Cuffs Off at Carswell." Fort Worth Weekly. Wednesday May 3, 2006.

Buildings of the United States government in Texas
Carswell

Carswell
Carswell
Carswell
Capital punishment in the United States
Prison healthcare
1994 establishments in Texas
Prison hospitals